Irina Bara and Rebeka Masarova were the defending champions but lost in the semifinals to Aliona Bolsova and Andrea Gámiz.

Bolsova and Gámiz went on to win the title, defeating Ekaterine Gorgodze and Laura Pigossi in the final, 6–3, 6–4.

Seeds

Draw

Draw

References
Main Draw

Open Ciudad de Valencia - Doubles